The Central District of Ahvaz County is a district (bakhsh) in Ahvaz County, Khuzestan Province, Iran. At the 2006 census, its population was 1,187,340, in 251,482 families.  The district has one city: Ahvaz. The district has five rural districts (dehestan): Anaqcheh Rural District, Elhayi Rural District, Esmailiyeh Rural District, Gheyzaniyeh Rural District, and Mosharrahat Rural District.

References 

Ahvaz County
Districts of Khuzestan Province